Grigory Borisovich  Karasin (born 23 August 1949) is a Russian career diplomat who formerly served as a State Secretary and a Deputy Minister of Foreign Affairs of Russia.

Career 
Karasin graduated from the Institute of Oriental Languages at Moscow State University in 1971, and went on to work in various diplomatic posts in the central offices of the Ministry of Foreign Affairs and abroad.

From March 2000 to June 2005, Karasin was the Ambassador of Russia to the United Kingdom, and returned to Moscow in June 2005 to take up the position of Deputy Minister of Foreign Affairs; since October 2005, he is also a State Secretary.

On 12 September 2019, he was appointed a member of the Federation Council, a representative of the Executive of the Sakhalin oblast, by the decree of the Governor Valery Limarenko.

Karasin speaks Russian, English, Hausa and French.

See also 
 Ambassador of Russia to the United Kingdom

References 

1949 births
Living people
Moscow State University alumni
Ambassador Extraordinary and Plenipotentiary (Russian Federation)
Ambassadors of Russia to the United Kingdom
Members of the Federation Council of Russia (after 2000)